Marcelo Enrique Leonart Tomas (born 1970) is a Chilean writer, filmmaker, and theater director.

Biography
An avid reader in childhood, Marcelo Leonart wrote his first play, No salgas esta noche, in 1991. It was in the last of these where he finished Mujer desnuda fumando en la ventana, his first book, which was published in 1999.

The following year, he was part of the scriptwriting team of the television series Romané. He went on to write for several other series. In 2012 he moved from TVN to Canal 13.

As a dramatist, Leonart has written a series of pieces, and among the most recent he has directed is El taller.

His first novel, Fotos de Laura, was applauded by critics and awarded, as was his second compilation of stories, La educación. After these two books appeared in 2012, he published the novels Lacra, La patria – whose main character is Francisco Javier Cuadra, minister of Augusto Pinochet – and Pascua, "which has at its center the abuses committed by priests."

As a filmmaker, Leonart co-directed, together with Paulo Avilés, the film Grita (based on his homonymous theatrical work), which premiered in 2009 at the Santiago International Film Festival.

He has a son, Dante, with his partner, the writer Nona Fernández, whom he met when they both studied at the Theater School of the Catholic University. In 2004 the couple founded the theater company La Fusa, with which Leonart staged all his works from Grita to Liceo de niñas. The latter premiered in 2015, and with it the company was renamed La Pieza Oscura.

Awards
 Óscar Castro Award
 First place at the Gabriela Mistral Literary Games
 1998 Juan Rulfo de Cuento Award (Radio France International, Paris) for Maribel bajo el brazo
 2011 National Book and Reading Council Award in the Best Unpublished Work category for La educación
 2011 Revista de Libros Award (El Mercurio) for Fotos de Laura
 2012 National Book Council Award in the Best Unpublished Work category for the novel Lacra
 2017 National Book Council Award in the Best Unpublished Work category for the novel Weichafe

Works

Narrative
 Mujer desnuda fumando en la ventana, stories, Colección del Sur, Planeta, 1999 (Booket, 2004); containing five texts:
 "Noticias de Milo", "Última llamada", "Maribel bajo el brazo", "Noches con Antonia", and "Mujer desnuda fumando en la ventana"
 Fotos de Laura, novel, El Mercurio/Aguilar, Santiago, 2012
 La educación, stories, Tajamar, Santiago, 2012; containing six stories: 
 "Crías", "Los perros", "Pájaros negro olfateando la carroña", "Caparazón", "Los cuerpos", and "La educación"
 La patria, novel with the principal character Francisco Javier Cuadra; Tajamar, Santiago, 2012
 Lacra, novel, Tajamar, Santiago, 2013
 Pascua, novel, Tajamar, Santiago, 2015 
 El libro rojo de la historia de Chile, novel, Tajamar, Santiago, 2016

Theater
 No salgas esta noche, 1991
 Sobre los mismos techos, 1992 
 SubCielo, fuego en la ciudad, 1994
 Pompa Bye-Bye, 1995
 Encadenados, 1997
 Grita, 2004; published in the book Bestiario, freakshow temporada 1973/1990, together with Medusa (2010, by Ximena Carrera) and El taller (2012, by Nona Fernández); Ceibo Ediciones, Santiago, 2013
 Lo invisible, 2006
 Cuerpos mutilados en el campo de batalla, 2007
 Todas las fiestas del mañana, 2008
 Noche mapuche, directed by the author; La Pieza Oscura company, GAM, 30 September – 28 October 2017

Telenovelas

Original stories
  (2003)
  (2005)
  (2005)
  (2006)
  (2007)
 40 y Tantos (2010)

Adaptations
 Romané (2000) – original by 
 Amores de mercado (2001) – original by Fernando Aragón and 
  (2008) – original by 
 Secretos en el jardín (2013) – original by Julio Rojas and Matías Ovalle

New versions rewritten by others
 Dulce amargo (2013) - by Iris Dubs

References

External links
 Marcelo Leonart at Tajamar Editores
 

1970 births
20th-century Chilean dramatists and playwrights
21st-century Chilean dramatists and playwrights
Chilean male dramatists and playwrights
Chilean film directors
Chilean theatre directors
Living people
Telenovela writers
Male television writers
Writers from Santiago